The 1995 Ukrainian Cup Final is a football match that took place at the Republican Stadium on May 28, 1995. The match was the 4th Ukrainian Cup Final and it was contested by FC Shakhtar Donetsk and FC Dnipro Dnipropetrovsk. The 1995 Ukrainian Cup Final was the fourth to be held in the Ukrainian capital Kyiv. Shakhtar won on penalty kicks 7:6 after the score was tied 1:1.

There were four yellow cards issued at this game: three to Shakhtar players and one to Dnipro.

Road to Kyiv 

Both teams started from the first round of the competition (1/16). Shakhtar stormed through the first three rounds beating Vorskla in Donetsk 8:0. In the semi-final it defeated the Cup holder Chornomorets. Dnipro had a little bit of trouble in the first round of competition facing the second team of Dynamo Kyiv. Later the team gained a great momentum defeating Tavria in the semi-final.

Match details

Match statistics

See also
 Ukrainian Cup 1994-95

References

External links 
 Calendar of Matches - Schedule of the 1994 Ukrainian Cup on the Ukrainian Soccer History web-site (ukrsoccerhistory.com). 

Cup Final
Ukrainian Cup finals
Ukrainian Cup Final 1995
Ukrainian Cup Final 1995
Sports competitions in Kyiv
Ukrainian Cup Final 1995